Louise Long (October 15, 1886 – July 14, 1966) was an American screenwriter, educator, author, and film editor active primarily in the 1920s and 1930s.

Biography 
Long, a native of Central City, Nebraska, was the daughter of Noah Long and Lois Palmer. She moved to California with her family when she was in high school. She went on to attend the University of Southern California, where she met her friend and future collaborator Ethel Doherty.

After college, Long and Doherty worked at L.A. public schools, but they'd dedicate their evenings to writing screenplays. Frustrated with their lack of success at selling their stories, they taught themselves shorthand and stenography and got jobs at Paramount (then Famous Players-Lasky). At night, they'd spend their time learning how to edit films.

They eventually worked their way into editing roles at Paramount, making $15 a week, before moving into screenwriting at $450 a week. Long's first big break into screenwriting was with 1926's The Campus Flirt, followed by Stranded in Paris that same year.

Long and Doherty worked steadily in film through the late 1930s before deciding to turn their interests to writing magazines and novels (including 1938's The Seeds of Time). The two continued to live and work together in Laguna Beach.

Selected filmography 

 Zoo in Budapest (1933)
 The Rebel (1931)
 The Virtuous Sin (1930) (scenario)
 Woman Trap (1929)
 The Greene Murder Case (1929)
 Fashions in Love (1929)
 What a Night! (1928)
 Three Weekends (1928)
 Interference (1928)
 Sawdust Paradise (1928) (adaptation)
 Love and Learn (1928)
 Figures Don't Lie (1927)
 Man Power (1927)
 Rough House Rosie (1927) (scenario)
 The World at Her Feet (1926)
 Stranded in Paris (1926)
 The Campus Flirt (1926) (scenario)

References 

1886 births
1966 deaths
American women screenwriters
American film editors
American women film editors
People from Central City, Nebraska
University of Southern California alumni
20th-century American women writers
20th-century American screenwriters